The EMC E4 was a , A1A-A1A passenger train-hauling diesel locomotive built by the Electro-Motive Corporation of La Grange, Illinois.  All were built for the Seaboard Air Line Railway. The E4 was the fifth model in a long line of passenger diesels of similar design known as EMD E-units.

The  was achieved with two EMC model 567 V12 engines developing , each engine driving its own electrical generator to power the traction motors. 

The front noses of the EA, E1A, E3A, E4A, E5A, and E6A cab units had a pronounced slant when viewed from the side. Therefore, these six models have been nicknamed "slant nose" units. Later E-unit models received the same blunted "bulldog nose" as the F-units.

Ironically, the E4 was produced before the E3. Both models were identical, save for the E4 having a pneumatically-operated nose door passageway in order to facilitate crew movement between units in a locomotive consist.

All the E4s were retired and scrapped by 1964.

Original owners

See also 

List of GM-EMD locomotives

References

External links
 

A1A-A1A locomotives
E4
Seaboard Air Line Railroad
Passenger locomotives
Diesel-electric locomotives of the United States
Railway locomotives introduced in 1938
Locomotives with cabless variants
Scrapped locomotives
Standard gauge locomotives of the United States
Streamlined diesel locomotives